Kelly Chambers may refer to:

 Kelly Chambers (footballer), English footballer and manager
 Kelly Chambers (politician), American politician and businesswoman